Thiopropazate (Artalan, Dartal, Dartalan, Dartan) is a typical antipsychotic of the phenothiazine class. It is a prodrug to perphenazine.

Thiopropazate is manufactured by Searle (US, UK)  & Boehringer Mannheim (Germany)
Thiopropazate is sold by Chembase, AAA Chemistry, ZINC, AKos Consulting & Solutions, Boc Sciences, ChemFrog, and ChemMol

Synthesis

The alkylation of 2-chloro-10-(3-chloropropyl)phenothiazine [2765-59-5] (1) with Piperazine (2) gives N-Desmethylprochlorperazine [40323-85-1] (3). Further alkylation with 2-Bromoethyl acetate [927-68-4] (4) gives Thiopropazate (5).

See also 
 Typical antipsychotic
 Phenothiazine

References 

Acetate esters
Chloroarenes
Phenothiazines
Piperazines
Typical antipsychotics